Laccornellus is a genus of beetles in the family Dytiscidae, containing the following species:

 Laccornellus copelatoides (Sharp, 1882)
 Laccornellus lugubris (Aubé, 1838)

References

Dytiscidae